Fitch Creek is a tributary of the Susquehanna River in Wyoming County, Pennsylvania, in the United States. The creek is not designated as an impaired waterbody. Its drainage basin is designated as a Coldwater Fishery and a Migratory Fishery.

Course

Fitch Creek begins in an unnamed lake in Falls Township. It flows south for a few tenths of a mile before and enters a valley. It then turns southwest for several tenths of a mile and its valley broadens. At this point, the creek turns south-southwest for a short distance before turning southeast for a few tenths of a mile and crossing Pennsylvania Route 92. It then heads in an easterly direction for several tenths of a mile before reaching its confluence with the Susquehanna River.

Fitch Creek joins the Susquehanna River  upriver of its mouth.

Tributaries
Fitch Creek has no named tributaries. However, it does have an unnamed tributary, which flows down a mountain to join Fitch Creek.

Hydrology
Fitch Creek is not designated as an impaired waterbody.

Geography and geology

The surficial geology near the mouth of Fitch Creek mainly consists of alluvium, Wisconsinan Outwash, and sand and gravel pits. Further upstream, Wisconsinan Till is most prevalent, but there are also a few patches of Wisconsinan Ice-Contact Stratified Drift, bedrock, and lakes.

A hill known as Post Hill is located to the east of Fitch Creek.

Watershed
The creek is entirely within the United States Geological Survey quadrangle of Ransom.

A waterfall known as the Fitch Creek Falls is on Fitch Creek.

The designated use of Fitch Creek is for aquatic life.

History
Fitch Creek was entered into the Geographic Names Information System on August 2, 1979. Its identifier in the Geographic Names Information System is 1199869.

A bridge carrying Pennsylvania Route 92 crosses Fitch Creek. As of October 2014, a bridge replacement project has been programmed for the bridge.

Biology
The drainage basin of Fitch Creek is designated as a Coldwater Fishery and a Migratory Fishery.

See also
Buttermilk Creek (Susquehanna River), next tributary of the Susquehanna River going downriver
Martin Creek (Susquehanna River), next tributary of the Susquehanna River going upriver
List of rivers of Pennsylvania

References

External links
Fitch Creek Falls

Rivers of Wyoming County, Pennsylvania
Tributaries of the Susquehanna River
Rivers of Pennsylvania